George Wood (December 31, 1919 – July 24, 2000) was an American film and television actor, usually billed as G. Wood.

Wood was born in Forrest City, Arkansas. He was one of four actors to appear in both the 1970 film M*A*S*H and the television series M*A*S*H (the other three being Timothy Brown, Corey Fischer and Gary Burghoff).  In both the film and the television series, Wood played General Hammond. The character was dropped after the show's first season. He also played the psychiatrist in the film Harold and Maude.

Wood died of congestive heart failure in Macon, Georgia, at the age of 80.

Filmography

References

External links

1919 births
2000 deaths
American male film actors
American male television actors
People from Forrest City, Arkansas
Male actors from Arkansas
20th-century American male actors
Deaths from congestive heart failure